Henry Appleton may refer to:
Henry Appleton (anarchist), 19th-century American individualist anarchist.
Henry Appleton (captain), 17th-century English captain in the navy and commodore
Sir Henry Appleton, 2nd Baronet (died 1649) of the Appleton baronets
Sir Henry Appleton, 3rd Baronet (died 1670) of the Appleton baronets
Sir Henry Appleton, 4th Baronet (died 1679) of the Appleton baronets
Sir Henry Appleton, 6th Baronet (died 1708) of the Appleton baronets
Henry Appleton, a character in the UK TV series Fallen Angel

See also
Appleton (disambiguation)